The Good and Faithful Servant is a darkly comic television play by the English playwright Joe Orton.

The play was later performed theatrically. A production directed by Fred Proud was performed at the King's Head Theatre in Islington, London in 1971.

A Canadian adaptation, aired in 1975 as an episode of the CBC Television anthology series Performance, starred Cyril Cusack and Helen Burns in the lead roles.

Original television cast 

 Donald Pleasence – Buchanan
 Hermione Baddeley – Edith 
 Patricia Routledge – Mrs Vealfoy
 Sheila White – Debbie
 Richard O'Callaghan – Ray
 Jack Bligh – old man

Plot
Buchanan, a doorman who has worked at the same company for fifty years is close to retirement when he meets Edith, a cleaning woman, who turns out to be his former lover and, unbeknownst to him, mother of his twin sons. Buchanan destroys his retirement gifts after having reflected on a wasted life, and in the following scene we see Buchanan and Edith, whom he married, waking up in bed together. Whilst she happily natters away Buchanan, tears running down his cheeks, closes his eyes and silently dies in bed next to her.

References

External links
 

1967 plays
British television plays
Plays by Joe Orton
English-language plays
Black comedy plays